Şekerbank A.Ş was founded in 1953 as the Sugar Beet Cooperative Bank in Eskişehir, Turkey. In 1956 the bank relocated to Ankara and was renamed to Şekerbank. The initial public offering of the bank was carried out in 1997, and in 2004 the bank relocated its headquarters again, this time to Istanbul, Turkey. Şekerbank is a bank that provides consumer loans, vehicle loans, housing loans and commercial loans. Dr. Hasan Basri Göktan is the chairman of the board of Şekerbank.

Contributions

Şeker Investment, Şeker Factoring, Şeker Leasing, Şeker Finance and Şekerbank Cyprus Ltd. are among Şekerbank participations.

References

Banks established in 1953
Banks of Turkey
Companies listed on the Istanbul Stock Exchange
Companies based in Istanbul
Turkish brands
Turkish companies established in 1953